Oulujoki is a river in Oulu province, Finland.  Its name in Finnish means literally "Oulu River", originally in old Northern Ostrobothnian dialect literally "Flood River". Its origin is Oulujärvi and its watershed area covers a significant part of Kainuu region. It flows into the Bothnian Bay at Oulu. Port of Oulu is located at the mouth of the river.

External links 
 

 
Rivers of Finland
Rivers of Muhos
Rivers of Oulu